The Go-Getter may refer to:

"The Go-Getter" (short story), a 1931 short story by English-American author P. G. Wodehouse
The Go-Getter (1923 film), American silent comedy film directed by 	Edward H. Griffith
The Go Getter (1937 film), American film starring George Brent and Anita Louise
The Go-Getter (1956 film), American film directed by Leigh Jason
The Go-Getter (2007 film), an American independent road movie
"The Go-Getter", a 1977 episode of the television series The Waltons
The Go-Getter: a Story That Tells You How to Be One, a 1921 short novel by American author Peter B. Kyne
"The Go Getter", a track on the 2010 Black Keys album Brothers
"Go Getters", a 2016 television episode of The Walking Dead

See also
Getter Robo Go (also known as Gettā Robo Gō? or Getter Robot Go), a 50-episode Japanese mecha anime and manga series
Go-Getters Out of the Gate, an anime television special based on video games
"Go Getta", a 2007 song by Young Jeezy